János Aczél (died 1523) was a royal secretary and poet.

He was replaced from the provostry of Vác to Pressburg (Pozsony, today's Bratislava) as the secretary of II. Louis. He was also the abbot of Garamszentbenedek (now Hronský Beňadik, Slovakia). He had died before he could take the position of provost in Pressburg. He wrote poems in Latin, but none of them survived.

Sources 
 Szinnyei József: Magyar írók élete és munkái, Arcanum, Budapest, 2000, 

Year of birth unknown
1523 deaths
15th-century Hungarian poets
16th-century Hungarian poets
Hungarian male poets
Writers from Bratislava